Arabic typography is the typography of letters, graphemes, characters or text in Arabic script, for example for writing Arabic, Persian, or Urdu. 16th century Arabic typography was a by-product of Latin typography with Syriac and Latin proportions and aesthetics. It lacked expertise in the three core aspects of Arabic writing: calligraphy, style and system. Calligraphy requires aesthetically skilled writing in a chosen canonical style such as naskh, nastaʿlīq or ruqʿah. System denotes the script grammar covering such rules as horizontality and stretching.

Characteristics 
Some characteristics used in Latin scripts, like bold, letter spacing or italic, are not usually used in Arabic typography.

Calligraphic style 
Some Arabic fonts are calligraphic, for example Arial, Courier New, and Times New Roman. They look as if they were written with a brush or oblong pen, akin to how serifs originated in stone inscriptionals. Other fonts, like Tahoma and Noto Sans Arabic, use a mono-linear style more akin to sans-serif Latin scripts. Monolinear means that the lines have the same width throughout the letter.

Overlines 

Historically, Arabic text used overlines instead of underlines used in Latin script.

Slant (italic) 
Some Arabic styles such as Diwani use a right-to-left downward-sloping slant.

Use of right angles 
Some fonts use more right angles, for example Noto Kufi Arabic. Others, like Tahoma and Arial, have a more rounded style (see graph below). A font with tendency towards right angles is also called 'angled', and rounded fonts are also called 'cursive'.

See also 

 
 Naskh (script)
 
 :Category:Iranian typographers and type designers
 Typeface anatomy
 :Category:Arabic typefaces

References

Further reading 

Typography